Jane Thompson, AICP (June 30, 1927 – August 22, 2016) was an American urbanist, designer and planner, with an international career exceeding forty years.

Biography
Thompson (née Fiske) was educated in the fine and applied arts at Vassar College with graduate work at Bennington College and NYU Institute of Fine Arts, her career has been devoted to the interaction of many facets of applied design. She spent early years in the Museum of Modern Art, becoming acting Assistant Curator in the Department of Architecture. This was followed by positions as Architecture Editor of Interiors Magazine. In 1954 she helped found Industrial Design (later known as International Design) magazine and served as its Editor-in-Chief

In the 1960s, sponsored by Edgar Kaufmann Jr.'s Foundation, she worked with Walter Gropius on an exploration of the creative educational methods of the original Bauhaus; she became a partner in architect Ben Thompson’s retail venture, Design Research, during its 60s expansion from Cambridge to New York to California.

She became Ben Thompson's second wife in 1969.

Jane Thompson handled programming and planning Benjamin Thompson & Associates, Architects and Planners (BTA), founded in 1967 in Cambridge, Massachusetts. As partner for planning, Jane headed Thompson's project teams on large urban planning projects, including the Chicago Navy Pier and Grand Central Business Improvement District. She died at the age of 89 on August 22, 2016.

Thompson Design Group 1994-2015

 After 1994, Jane Thompson was Principal of her own firm, Thompson Design Group (TDG). The company had an emphasis on preservation and imaginative reuse of obsolete places. Master plan projects included Navy Pier in Chicago, Governors Island in New York, and North Coast Harbor in Cleveland. All were accomplished in partnership with the architect and urban planner Pratap Talwar, TDG's Principal in Charge.

Thompson and Talwar also branched into large-scale redevelopment planning; the firm's Master Planning and Development Guidelines for the City of Long Branch NJ, have received top awards from the Monmouth County Planning Department and New Jersey State Department of Planning.

TDG's comprehensive Masterplan for all lands bordering Houston's 10-mile-long Buffalo Bayou waterway (a district of 10 square miles ) won acclaim as a far-seeing urban planning model.

Jane Thompson was active in the International Design Conference in Aspen (IDCA) from 1971–2002, as a board member, program chairman, and speaker. In 1994, she was awarded Institute Honors by the American Institute of Architects, and in 1998 received the Personal Recognition Award of the Industrial Design Society of America for a lifetime contribution to the field of design.

For their lifelong support of Finnish Design and way of life, the President of Finland in 2000 named Ben and Jane Thompson each individually as Knight First Class, Order of the Lion of Finland.

In 2010, "Sir Lady Jane" as she was nicknamed (as both a Knight and wife of a Knight) was honored with the Lifetime Achievement Award of the Cooper-Hewitt National Design Museum. Then followed an Honorary PhD from Boston Architectural College, 2011, and the lifetime Award of Honor from Boston Society of Architects in 2012.

Bibliography

 Jane Thompson and Alexandra Lange, Design Research: The Store That Brought Modern Living to American Homes, 2010. .

Notes

1927 births
2016 deaths
American designers
National Design Award winners
Vassar College alumni
Bennington College alumni
New York University Institute of Fine Arts alumni
Knights First Class of the Order of the Lion of Finland
20th-century American architects
21st-century American architects
American urban planners
American women architects
Women urban planners
21st-century American women